Pedro Joaquin Mendoza was born in San Marcos de Colón on September 18, 1966. From a young age he demonstrated his extraordinary painting abilities. He studied in San Marcos, in the southern part of Honduras, and in 1983 he moved to Tegucigalpa with the desire to dedicate himself to professional painting.

Professional experience 

1980
The National Board of Social Wellbeing youth painting competition commemorating the XXII anniversary of the foundation

1986
The National Board of Social Wellbeing, Presidential Auction Dinner promoting youth art

1987
Diplomatic auction dinner benefiting the San Jeronimo Emiliani
National Board of Social Wellbeing Christmas children’s auction
Individual art exposition for the town fair of San Marcos de Colón

1988
Third national competition “Alvaro Canales” during the inauguration of the Pablo Zelaya National Art Gallery

1989
Collective exposition at Trios Gallery
Collective exposition at Classes Gallery in Tegucigalpa
Collective exposition at Copantl Sula Gallery

1990
Collective exposition at the National Heritage Headquarters
Individual exposition at Classes Gallery in Tegucigalpa
Anthology at the Plastic Arts of Honduras

1991
Collective exposition in San Pedro Sula at the Copantl Hotel
Deco Art Gallery in La Ceiba, Atlantida
Collective exposition in the National Auditorium
Miniature exposition in I.H.C.I.
Exposition Ferisur

1992
Honduras landscape figurines, OEA Tegucigalpa
Anthology at the Plastic Arts of Honduras
AEOFFAA, Supporting Arts painting donations

1993
Landscape and portraits, Banco Atlantida
Painting exposition for the Costa Rican Women's Associations in Tegucigalpa
Participation in the painting exposition as an executive committee member at the Southern Fair

1994
First gathering of plastic arts at Hotel and Club Copantl
First gathering at grand hall of International
First gathering of Plastic Arts in San Pedro Sula

1995
FERISANMC, Santa Ana town fair
Artistic Project at the honorable Municipal Corporation in Puerto Cortes
Auction dinner ROTARAC Banco Atlantida
Homage to an artista, The Chosen Son, San Marcos de Colon

1996
Sales exposition with Mayor Marlon Lara, Mayor's Office Puerto Cortes
Rainbow, Tela Railroad Company

1997
First Honduran/Costa Rican art exposition in Guios Restaurant Roatan
Miniature exposition in I.H.C.I.

1998
Auction at the San Miguel de Heredia Rotary Club.
Four Painters at the Margarita Zepeda Gallery.
Collective exposition at the American Embassy.

1999
Three painters/Three styles exposition I.C.H.I. Banco del Pais in San Pedro Sula.
Inauguration of the Amazon Gallery

2000
Auction at the San Miguel de Heredia Rotary Club

2001
Collective exposition at the inauguration of the Berenes Gallery
Sales exposition in Mall Multiplaza

2002
Benefit auction in the Medalla Milagrosa Church

2003
Exposition “An Angel in the Art of Living” San Pedro Sula Hotel Princess
Cultural journey presenting “Uniting Nations”

2004
Sales exposition, San Miguel de Heredia Woman’s Rotary Club
Dinner auction, hosted by the I.H.C.I. and the French Alliance, benefitting San Filipe Hospital

2008
National School of Fine Arts

2010
Tegucigalpa Woman’s Rotary Club committee member, IX festival of painting

2011
Tegucigalpa Woman’s Rotary Club committee member, X festival of Honduran paintings by Benigno Gomez

2012
Tegucigalpa Woman’s Rotary Club committee member, XI festival of Honduran paintings

International achievements 
1989 – Gulf Stream Galleries Inc, Miami, Florida
1992 – Lompie Art Exposition, Geneva, Switzerland
1994 – Contemporary Latino Art, Miami, Florida
1994 – Museum of Art and History, San Juan, Puerto Rico
1995 – New Orleans Encounter, Baton Rouge, Louisiana
1996 – University of Florida
2002 – Art exposition Barcelona, Spain
2002 - Art exposition World Work Organization, Switzerland
2003 – Hondurans Prosperous Land, artist
2014 – Canadian Art Exposition, Ottawa and Montreal

Examples of paintings

References

Honduran artists